The year 1970 was the 189th year of the Rattanakosin Kingdom of Thailand. It was the 25th year in the reign of King Bhumibol Adulyadej (Rama IX), and is reckoned as year 2513 in the Buddhist Era.

Incumbents
King: Bhumibol Adulyadej 
Crown Prince: (vacant)
Prime Minister: Thanom Kittikachorn
Supreme Patriarch: Ariyavangsagatayana V

Events

December
9-20- The 1970 Asian Games were held again in Bangkok for a second time.

 
Years of the 20th century in Thailand
Thailand
Thailand
1970s in Thailand